The Arboretum de Matton-Clémency (1 hectare) is an arboretum located in Matton-et-Clémency, Ardennes, Grand Est, France. The arboretum was created by volunteers, and now contains 150 species of trees, as well as a pergola, waterwheel, and pond with bridge. It is open daily without charge. In the mid-1990s, an arboretum was created on a former vacant lot.

It is currently a well-kept natural space bordering the dark forest of the Ardennes.

See also 
 List of botanical gardens in France

References 

 Arboretum de Matton-Clémency
 Tourisme Champagne Ardenne description
 1001 Fleurs description (French)

Gardens in Ardennes (department)
Matton-Clémency